The British West Indies Championships was an annual track and field competition between nations involved in the West Indies Federation and several other Caribbean nations with a British colonial history. Like the federation itself, the competition was short-lived: first held in 1957, it ceased after 1965. The competition was created at a time of much sporting co-operation within the region – a British West Indies team was sent to both the 1959 Pan American Games and the 1960 Summer Olympics.

The first event in 1957, held in Kingston, Jamaica, was supported by retired Olympic sprint medallist Herb McKenley. The national championships of the host nation was sometimes replaced by the regional championships.

The championships featured prominent Caribbean men's sprinters of the period, including Commonwealth champion Tom Robinson, and Jamaican Olympic medallists Lennox Miller, George Kerr and Malcolm Spence. Other prominent champions of this event were hurdler Keith Gardner and high jumper Ernle Haisley (both Commonwealth champions). Women were not invited to the first two editions of the competition, but a women's programme was introduced from 1959 onwards.

Editions

Participating nations

References

 
Athletics competitions in the Caribbean
British West Indies
Recurring sporting events established in 1957
Recurring events disestablished in 1965
Annual sporting events
Defunct athletics competitions